Sagar Sangam railway station is a railway station in Raigad district, Maharashtra, India. Its code is SGSGM. It serves the Sagar Sangam area of Navi Mumbai. The station includes two platforms.

References

Railway stations in Raigad district
Mumbai CR railway division
Transport in Navi Mumbai
Proposed railway stations in India
Mumbai Suburban Railway stations